The Monmouth University Polling Institute is a public opinion research institute located on the Monmouth University campus in West Long Branch, New Jersey. The Polling Institute was established in 2005, and since its establishment has been led by director Patrick Murray.

As of March 2022, the polling analysis website FiveThirtyEight led by statistician Nate Silver, had 120 Monmouth polls in its database, and gave the polling institute an "A" grade on the basis of its historical accuracy and methodology. The poll appeared on the list in 2014 with an A-minus, and received an A-plus in 2016, 2018 and 2020. The Institute is a signatory to the American Association for Public Opinion Research (AAPOR) Transparency Initiative.

Recognition
In 2009, the institute's gubernatorial polling received national attention, including findings that indicated the eventual winner Chris Christie's weight was an issue for voters in the campaign.

In 2010, the institute's director Patrick Murray was named "Pollster of the Year" by PolitickerNJ and one of the 100 most influential people in New Jersey politics. Murray is an occasional contributor to the Huffington Post's Pollster page.

See also 

 The Phillips Academy Poll
 Quinnipiac University Polling Institute
 Suffolk University Political Research Center
 Emerson College Polling
 Siena Research Institute
 Marist Institute for Public Opinion

References

External links
 Official website
2005 establishments in New Jersey
Monmouth University
Public opinion research companies in the United States